Mallobathra is a genus of moths belonging to the family Psychidae, and are bagworm moths. This genus was first described by Edward Meyrick. It is endemic to New Zealand. The type species of this genus is Mallobathra crataea.

Description
Meyrick originally described this genus as follows:

Behaviour
Winged females of Mallobathra species are reluctant to fly with some being semi-apterous. They drop to the ground when disturbed. The males are active flyers.

Habitat and hosts
Species in this genus can be found from sea level to the alpine zones, and have a wide tolerance of sites and climate. Some species in this genus are common in forest or scrub, with trunk-frequenting or litter-living larvae, while others are found on lichen covered cliffs. The larva of the only member of the genus known from the subantarctic, Mallobathra campbellica, is a litter-dwelling species.

Species

References 

Psychidae
Moths of New Zealand
Endemic fauna of New Zealand
Taxa named by Edward Meyrick
Psychidae genera
Endemic moths of New Zealand